The 2013 Central American Games football tournament is an under-21 age group association football tournament.

Venues

References 

2013 Central American Games
Cen
2013
2013